Sa'd ibn al-Rabi' was a sahabi (companion) of the Islamic prophet Muhammad. Muhammad made brothers between him and Abd al-Rahman ibn Awf, and he insisted to give his brother half of his wealth and one of his two orchards. He was one of the chiefs who attended the ‘Aqabah Pledge of Allegiance. He was martyred in the battle of Uhud.

See also
Sahaba

External links

625 deaths
Year of birth unknown
Companions of the Prophet